Phoradendron libocedri is a species of flowering plant in the sandalwood family known by the common name incense-cedar mistletoe. It is native to western North America from Oregon to Baja California, where it grows in forests on its host tree, the California incense-cedar (Calocedrus decurrens).

This mistletoe is a shrub producing greenish erect, hanging, or drooping branches from a woody base where it grows attached to the tree, parasitizing it for water and nutrients. As a hemiparasite it contains some chlorophyll and can photosynthesize some energy for itself as well. The smooth, noded branches have flattened, scale-like leaves.

The plant is dioecious, with male and female individuals producing different forms of inflorescence with knobby flower clusters. Female flowers yield light pink or yellowish spherical berries each 3 or 4 millimeters wide.

External links
Jepson Manual Treatment - Phoradendron libocedri
Phoradendron libocedri - Photo gallery

libocedri
Parasitic plants
Flora of California
Flora of Baja California
Flora of Oregon
Flora of the Sierra Nevada (United States)
Dioecious plants
Flora without expected TNC conservation status